Steve Lightfoot (sometimes credited as Steven Lightfoot or Robert Scott Fraser) is a British television writer and producer who worked as an executive producer and writer on the NBC thriller television series Hannibal, the Netflix series Marvel's The Punisher and, recently, the Netflix thriller miniseries Behind Her Eyes.

Education 
Lightfoot graduated from the University of East Anglia with an MA in creative writing.

Television career 
Since the early 2000s, Lightfoot has worked on a number of high-profile television series as a producer and writer, including Casualty, Taggart, House of Saddam, Camelot, Transporter: The Series, Hannibal, and Narcos. He also serves as showrunner for The Punisher. On January 25, 2019, it was announced that Lightfoot would be credited as an executive producer and writer in the Netflix thriller miniseries, Behind Her Eyes.

Filmography

Camelot 
 (1.07) "The Long Night"
 (1.08) "Igraine" (with Chris Chibnall and Louise Fox)

Transporter: The Series 
 (1.02) "Trojan Horsepower"
 (1.11) "Cherchez La Femme"

Hannibal 
 (1.09) "Trou Normand"
 (1.11) "Rôti" (with Bryan Fuller and Scott Nimerfro)
 (1.13) "Savoureux" (with Bryan Fuller and Scott Nimerfro)
 (2.01) "Kaiseki" (with Bryan Fuller)
 (2.03) "Hassun" (with Jason Grote)
 (2.05) "Mukōzuke" (with Ayanna A. Floyd and Bryan Fuller)
 (2.06) "Futamono" (with Andy Black, Bryan Fuller and Scott Nimerfro)
 (2.07) "Yakimono" (with Bryan Fuller)
 (2.08) "Su-zakana" (with Bryan Fuller and Scott Nimerfro)
 (2.10) "Naka-Choko" (with Kai Yu Wu)
 (2.13) "Mizumono" (with Bryan Fuller)
 (3.01) "Antipasto" (with Bryan Fuller)
 (3.03) "Secondo" (with Angelina Burnett and Bryan Fuller)
 (3.04) "Aperitivo" (with Nick Antosca and Bryan Fuller)
 (3.05) "Contorno" (with Bryan Fuller and Tom de Ville)
 (3.06) "Dolce" (with Bryan Fuller and Don Mancini)
 (3.07) "Digestivo" (with Bryan Fuller)
 (3.08) "The Great Red Dragon" (with Nick Antosca and Bryan Fuller)
 (3.09) "And the Woman Clothed with the Sun..." (with Bryan Fuller, Helen Shang and Jeff Vlaming)
 (3.11) "...And the Beast from the Sea" (with Bryan Fuller)
 (3.13) "The Wrath of the Lamb" (with Nick Antosca and Bryan Fuller)}

The Punisher 
 (1.01) "3 AM"
 (1.02) "Two Dead Men"
 (1.03) "Kandahar"
 (1.13) "Memento Mori"
 (2.01) "Roadhouse Blues"
 (2.02) "Fight or Flight"
 (2.09) "Flustercluck" (with Ken Kristensen)
 (2.10) "The Dark Hearts of Men" (with Angela LaManna)
 (2.13) "The Whirlwind"

Behind Her Eyes 
 (1.01) "Chance Encounters"
 (1.02) "Lucid Dreaming" 
 (1.05) "The Second Door"
 (1.06) "Behind Her Eyes"

Awards and nominations 
In 2009, Lightfoot was nominated for a BAFTA Award for producing House of Saddam.

References

External links 

 

21st-century British screenwriters
British television writers
British male television writers
British television producers
Living people
Place of birth missing (living people)
Year of birth missing (living people)
Alumni of the University of East Anglia